The women's 800 metre freestyle competition of the swimming events at the 2012 European Aquatics Championships took place May 23 and 24. The heats took place on May 23, the final on May 24.

Records
Prior to the competition, the existing world, European and championship records were as follows.

Results

Heats
16 swimmers participated in 2 heats.

Final
The final was held at 17:02.

References

Women's 800 m freestyle